Winslow T. Wheeler is the Director of the Straus Military Reform Project of the Project On Government Oversight in the Washington, D.C. area.
He has authored two books: The Wastrels of Defense: How Congress Sabotages National Security (US Naval Institute Press) and Military Reform: An Uneven History and an Uncertain Future  (Stanford University Press).  He is also the editor of two anthologies, The Pentagon Labyrinth: 10 Short Essays to Help You Through It and America’s Defense Meltdown: Military Reform for President Obama and the New Congress.

Life
From 1971 to 2002, Wheeler worked on national security issues for members of the United States Senate and for the Government Accountability Office (GAO): In the Senate, Jacob K. Javits (R, NY), Nancy Landon Kassebaum (R, KS), David Pryor (D, AR), and Pete Domenici (R, NM). He was the first, and according to Senate records the last, Senate staffer to work simultaneously on the personal staffs of a Republican and a Democrat (Pryor and Kassebaum).

In the Senate staff, Wheeler was involved in legislating the War Powers Act, Pentagon reform legislation, foreign policy, and oversight of the defense budget and weapons programs.  At GAO, he directed comprehensive studies on the 1991 Gulf War air campaign, the US strategic nuclear triad, and weapons testing.  Each of these studies found prevailing conventional wisdom about weapons to be badly misinformed.

In 2002 when he worked on the Republican staff of the Senate Budget Committee, Wheeler authored an essay, under the pseudonym "Spartacus," addressing Congress' reaction to the September 11, 2001 terrorist attacks ("Mr. Smith Is Dead: No One Stands in the Way as Congress Lards Post-September 11 Defense Bills with Pork").  When senators criticized in the essay attempted to have Wheeler fired, he resigned his position.

He has appeared in interviews on national TV and radio, as well as having written articles and commentaries for national, local, and professional  publications on national defense and military affairs issues.  These venues include “60 Minutes,” C-SPAN's “Book Notes” and “Q & A,” National Public Radio, the PBS NewsHour, the Washington Post, the Politico, Mother Jones, Barron's, Defense News, and Armed Forces Journal.

He is married; they have two sons.

Works
 
The Wastrels of Defense: How Congress Sabotages U.S. Security, U.S. Naval Institute Press, October 2004,

References

External links

"The Pentagon Labyrinth: 10 Short Essays to Help You Through It"
"Winslow T. Wheeler",  Security Policy Working Group 
http://security.nationaljournal.com/contributors/winslow-t-wheeler.php
http://www.military.com/Opinions/0,,Wheeler_Index,00.html
http://www.huffingtonpost.com/winslow-t-wheeler

Living people
American military writers
Employees of the United States Senate
Year of birth missing (living people)